Bobby Howe (born 6 November 1973) is an English former professional footballer who played as a midfielder. He played junior football for Cramlington Juniors FC before he joined Nottingham Forest playing from 1990 to 1998 but making just 14 league appearances in that time. He later joined Swindon Town for a £30,000 fee, where he made his last league appearance in 2002. He later played non league football for Havant & Waterlooville and Farnborough Town.

References

SportingHeroes.net
Since 1888... The Searchable Premiership and Football League Player Database (subscription required)

1973 births
Living people
English footballers
Association football midfielders
Premier League players
Nottingham Forest F.C. players
Ipswich Town F.C. players
Swindon Town F.C. players
Havant & Waterlooville F.C. players
Farnborough F.C. players
People from Cramlington
Footballers from Northumberland